Qawm is a basic social unit of Afghanistan that is based on kinship, residence, or occupation. It is sometimes translated as "tribe", but the qawm relationship may cross tribal or even ethnic boundaries.

The protean word qawm is of Arabic origin, and is used in Afghanistan to refer to any form of solidarity. Afghans identify themselves by qawm, rather than by tribe or nationality. Qawm identity has added to the challenge of creating a national identity in Afghanistan. A qawm is typically governed by a jirga or shura (a council or assembly of elder males).

See also
Ethnic groups in Afghanistan
Qaum

References

Further reading
 Goodson, Larry. Afghanistan's Endless War. University of Washington Press, 2001. 
 Rubin, Barnett R. "The Fragmentation of Afghanistan". Yale University Press, 1995 (Second Edition in 2002)

External links
 Ethnicity and Tribe in Afghanistan
 Afghan social structure

Society of Afghanistan